Walter Martin Hasenfus (March 18, 1916 – December 8, 1944) was an American canoeist who competed in the 1936 Summer Olympics.

He was born in Needham, Massachusetts and is the younger brother of Joseph Hasenfus.

In 1936, he finished fifth together with his brother Joseph in the C-2 10000 metre event.

He was killed in action during World War II, while serving with the 307th Infantry, 77th Division in the South Pacific, most likely in the Philippines.

References

External links
Walter Hasenfus at Sports Reference.com

1916 births
1944 deaths
American male canoeists
Canoeists at the 1936 Summer Olympics
Olympic canoeists of the United States
United States Army personnel killed in World War II
United States Army soldiers